American singer Miley Cyrus has released seven studio albums, as well as two extended plays and a live album since her debut in 2006. This has resulted in six concert tours (four of them worldwide), and a lot of TV and award show performances. Since her musical debut in 2006, thanks to the Disney Channel series Hannah Montana (2006-2011), she has been promoting all of her albums as well as her debut Hannah Montana 2: Meet Miley Cyrus, in 2007 and 2008, through performances at several festivals including the Houston Livestock Show and Rodeo.

Following the Hannah Montana series, Cyrus embarked through 2007 and 2008 on her debut concert tour, the Best of Both Worlds Tour, which only visited North America and grossed over $54 million. In March 2009, Cyrus released the soundtrack of her first headlining theatre movie Hannah Montana: The Movie. Later that year she embarked on her first world tour and second in general named Wonder World Tour which visited North America and the United Kingdom and Ireland where she promoted her second studio album Breakout (2008) as well as her first EP The Time of Our Lives, released in August 2009.

Cyrus' next tour was named Gypsy Heart Tour which began in April 2011 and ended in July 2011 visiting Latin America and Oceania. The tour ranked 22nd in Pollstar's "Top 50 Worldwide Tours (Mid-Year)", earning over $26 million. Cyrus made this statement about the tour: "The Gypsy Heart tour is a dream come true. Not only because of all the beautiful cities I will get to visit, but all of the beautiful people I will get to meet. Gypsy Heart is not just a tour for me, but a mission to spread love".

In October 2013 Cyrus announced on Saturday Night Live her fourth concert tour named Bangerz Tour in support of her 2013 album Bangerz. The tour began in Vancouver in February 2014 and ended in late October in Australia. It was the 16th highest-grossing tour of 2014, earning $62.9 million. Footage from the shows at Barcelona and Lisbon was filmed, airing on NBC on July 6, 2014. It was then released on DVD and Blu-ray on March 24, 2015.

At the end of the 2015 MTV Video Music Awards celebrated at The Forum on August 30, 2015, which Cyrus hosted, she announced that her fifth studio album Miley Cyrus & Her Dead Petz was available for free online streaming. The album was self-published. In April 2017, the album was officially uploaded to iTunes and paid music subscription services like Apple Music and Spotify, after only being available for free on SoundCloud for almost 2 years. Cyrus embarked on an eight-concert tour in support of the album in the end of 2015. On December 19, 2015, go90 live streamed Cyrus' Los Angeles show, the farewell night of the tour.

Cyrus' sixth studio album Younger Now was released in September 2017. To promote the album, the singer attended The Tonight Show Starring Jimmy Fallon for a whole week. No tour in support of the album has been booked or announced yet.

Concert tours

Live performances

Hannah Montana era

Hannah Montana 2: Meet Miley Cyrus era

Breakout era

Hannah Montana: The Movie era

The Time of Our Lives era

Can't Be Tamed era

Bangerz era

Miley Cyrus & Her Dead Petz era

Younger Now era

She Is Coming era

Plastic Hearts era

References 

Live performances
Miley Cyrus